is the third studio album by Japanese idol duo Wink, released by Polystar on December 1, 1989. It features the No. 1 singles "Samishii Nettaigyo" and "One Night in Heaven (Mayonaka no Angel)". Also included in the album are Japanese-language covers of Bobby Caldwell's "Special to Me", Paul Gurvitz's "I Never Stopped Loving You", REO Speedwagon's "In Your Letter", Shocking Blue's "Never Marry a Railroad Man", Kool & the Gang's "Joanna", and John Lennon's "Oh My Love". "Special to Me" was released as a promotional single in 2018 to celebrate the duo's 30th anniversary.

The album peaked at No. 2 on Oricon's albums chart and sold over 454,000 copies. It was also certified Platinum by the RIAJ.

Track listing 
All music is arranged by Motoki Funayama, except where indicated.

Charts

Certification

References

External links 
 
 
 

1989 albums
Wink (duo) albums
Japanese-language albums